Nevinson is a surname. Notable people with the surname include:

 Christopher R. W. Nevinson (1889–1946), English painter, etcher and lithographer
 Gennie Nevinson, Australian actress
 George Nevinson (1882–1963), British water polo player
 Henry Nevinson (1856–1941), British writer
 Margaret Nevinson (1858–1932), British suffragist
 Nancy Nevinson (1918–2012), English actress
 John Nevison (1910–1987), English cricketer

See also
 Nevins (disambiguation)
 Nevison